CAPM may refer to:

 Capital asset pricing model, a fundamental model in finance
 Certified Associate in Project Management, an entry-level credential for project managers